Eryphus flavicollis is a species of beetle in the family Cerambycidae. It was described by Fisher in 1938.

References

Heteropsini
Beetles described in 1938